Pilocrocis metachrysias is a moth in the family Crambidae. It was described by George Hampson in 1918. It is found in Peru.

The wingspan is about 35 mm. The forewings are black brown glossed with silvery blue to beyond the end of the cell and on the inner area to the middle. The rest of the wing is glossed with purple. The hindwings are orange yellow, the terminal area is black brown glossed with purple.

References

Pilocrocis
Moths described in 1918
Moths of South America